Cary Granat is an American film producer and studio executive. He is best known for co-founding and serving as CEO for Walden Media from 2000 to 2009 and acting as president and COO of Miramax Films’ Dimension Division from 1995 to 2000. While at Walden Media, Granat secured the rights to C.S. Lewis’ Chronicles of Narnia series and oversaw production on the successful first film of the franchise, The Lion, The Witch, and the Wardrobe. Granat's other films include Scream, Journey to the Center of the Earth, Scary Movie, Amazing Grace, and Spy Kids.

Education 
Granat went to Tufts University from 1986-1990. In addition to attending, Granat helped to establish the Communications and Media Studies School and serves on its board.

Career
Cary Granat worked at MCA/Universal first as director of development from 1992 to 1995. He worked on films such as Babe and Casino, as well as acquired the original Meet the Parents, a Gregg Glienna film, for remake. While working in the film group under Hal Lieberman and Casey Silver, Granat also found himself evaluating corporate deals for the company. While this was outside his job purview, it built a mentor relationship for Granat with company chairman Tom Pollock.

After Universal, Granat joined Dimension Films as head of creative and then later as president and COO from 1995 to 2000. Granat worked closely with and for Bob Weinstein to build Dimension into one of the most recognizable brands in the entertainment business, managing a roster that became distinguished for both its trend-setting content and international box-office success. This includes the blockbuster Scream franchise, the Wayans' Scary Movie franchise and Dimension's launch of Robert Rodriguez’s highly successful Spy Kids franchise. During this time Dimension re-established the studio system of the 1930s and '40s, building an exclusive family of artists including Guillermo del Toro, Robert Rodriguez, Wes Craven, Kevin Williamson, Ehren Kruger, and Ben Affleck. In addition to films, Dimension capitalized on the synergy between music and film, establishing the alliance of Sony and Capitol/EMI in the formation of Miramax/Dimension Records. The Dimension Executive team of the 1990s was a highly collaborative group of executives who all fought for the success of the projects; such as Andrew Rona, Andrew Gumpert, Michael Helfant, Richard Potter, Randy Spendlove, Brian Burkin, and Josh Greenstein.

In 2000, Granat co-founded Walden Media. He served as CEO from 2000 to 2009. As CEO, Granat gained the rights to C.S. Lewis’ Chronicles of Narnia series and oversaw production on the first film of the franchise, The Lion, The Witch, and the Wardrobe—one of the highest-grossing films of 2005. The Narnia franchise has generated over $1.62 billion in theatrical gross on its first three installments. In addition to the Chronicles of Narnia, Granat produced the Journey to the Center of the Earth franchise, Charlotte’s Web, James Cameron’s Aliens of the Deep, Ghosts of the Abyss, Bridge to Terabithia, Holes, and over 50 other children's films and books. Granat built out Walden's film, educational, and faith activities locally in the U.K., Australia, New Zealand, South Korea, France, Germany, Japan, and other foreign markets. In addition to his duties as CEO, Granat was appointed in April 2004 as president of Anschutz Film Group, whereby the company acquired Crusader Entertainment and supervised the completion of the award-winning biography Ray and the Matthew McConaughey film, Sahara. After Granat and team produced Amazing Grace, he and company co-founder Michael Flaherty earned the prestigious John Templeton Foundation Epiphany Prize.

From 2010 to 2014, Granat was a partner at Reel FX/Granat Ent. The artist-driven production and development company, Granat Entertainment, merged with animation studio Reel FX in order to create a new live-action/animation studio. The company forged partnerships with Andrew Adamson, Guillermo Del Toro, James Cameron, Cirque du Soleil, Fox Film, Steve Aoki and others while producing Free Birds, The Book of Life, World Away, The Hive, and other projects.

In 2012, Granat co-founded and launched Immersive Artistry, an entertainment business. The company is a participatory experience considered the newest evolution in media placing you inside the movie, rather than watching it. The company will be launching its first locations in Las Vegas, China, and throughout the world in 2019. Granat serves as the company CEO.

In 2014, Granat founded EMH Consulting Group, Inc., a Consultancy and Film Operations group that represent Foreign Governments in their effort to build and/or rebuild their film and television operations into sustainable industries. Granat and his team have taken their history of producing films in over 40 countries, which have grossed north of $5.8 billion in theatrical revenues, and brought those skill sets to New Zealand, Romania, Montenegro, Latvia, and Kazakhstan.

Activism 
Granat is a board member of the World Information Transfer of the United Nations and organizes an annual conference on Children's Health and the Environment every December.

In 2004, Granat co-founded The Forgotten Dog Foundation, a dog rescue foundation specializing in emergency medical needs.

Awards
 In 2005, Granat received the P.T. Barnum Award from Tufts University for his exceptional work in the field of media and entertainment.
 John Templeton Foundation Epiphany Award.
 Common Sense Media Award.

Filmography

References

Sources
 

American chief executives in the media industry
Place of birth missing (living people)
Year of birth missing (living people)
Tufts University alumni
Living people
American film producers